Albareto is a comune (municipality) in the Province of Parma in the Italian region Emilia-Romagna, located about  west of Bologna and about  southwest of Parma.

Albareto borders the following municipalities: Borgo Val di Taro, Compiano, Pontremoli, Sesta Godano, Tornolo, Varese Ligure, Zeri.

References

External links
 Official website

Cities and towns in Emilia-Romagna